Westeinde (Dutch for "West end") is the name of a number of villages in the Netherlands:

 Westeinde, Drenthe
 Westeinde, North Holland
 Westeinde, Zoeterwoude, in the province of South Holland